Andriy Volodymyrovych Sakhnevych (born 17 April 1989) is a Ukrainian professional footballer who plays as a defender.

External links 
 
 

1989 births
Living people
Ukrainian footballers
Ukraine youth international footballers
Ukraine under-21 international footballers
FC Dynamo Kyiv players
FC Dynamo-2 Kyiv players
FC Dynamo-3 Kyiv players
FC Oleksandriya players
FC Metalurh Zaporizhzhia players
Ukrainian Premier League players
Ukrainian First League players
Ukrainian Second League players
Association football defenders
FC KAMAZ Naberezhnye Chelny players
Ukrainian expatriate footballers
Expatriate footballers in Russia
FC Hirnyk-Sport Horishni Plavni players
FC Kolos Kovalivka players
FK Ventspils players
FC Polissya Zhytomyr players
Latvian Higher League players
Expatriate footballers in Latvia
Ukrainian expatriate sportspeople in Latvia
Footballers from Zhytomyr